Phoenix Petroleum Philippines, Inc. is the first independent oil company to be listed in the Philippine Stock Exchange after the Oil Deregulation Law was passed in 1998. It is the first company from Davao City to be listed in the Philippine Stock Exchange.

Phoenix is engaged in the business of trading refined petroleum products and lubricants, operation of oil depots and storage facilities, and allied services.

History

Phoenix is a home-grown company in Davao City. It was originally incorporated on May 8, 2002 as Oilink Mindanao Distribution, Inc., and changed its name in January 2004 to Davao Oil Terminal Services Corporation (DOTSCO). The small family business began operations in its current form thereon, distributing petroleum products to various commercial entities in Mindanao. Its first big account was Cebu Pacific. As the airline's exclusive logistics partner since 2004, the oil company provides Cebu Pacific's refueling requirements in all its Mindanao destinations.

In 2006, the company was renamed Phoenix Petroleum Philippines, Inc. and introduced lubricants and car care products to its product line.

It became a publicly-listed company on July 11, 2007, offering 25% of its total outstanding shares to the public. Phoenix Petroleum became the first independent oil company to be listed in the Philippine Stock Exchange after the Oil Deregulation Law was passed in 1998. Phoenix Petroleum also became the first company from Davao City to go public.

Phoenix received a certification for ISO 9001:2000 quality system standards for its Davao bulk plant and aviation fuel tank truck operations in 2008. In the same year, the oil company opened its first Manila station in Marikina and has jumped to rank 242 in the Philippines Top 10,000 Corporations in 2008 from being in rank 473 in 2007. In 2011, it ranked 53rd. Phoenix is the first petroleum company to introduce a toll-free number for franchising in 2009.

The Social Security System acquired up to 9.68 percent stake in Phoenix Petroleum in 2009, from its initial 2.78 percent. "We believe that with its track record and its positive business prospects, our addition of Phoenix Petroleum to the SSS' list of investments was a good decision," says SSS President Romulo Neri.

World boxing champion Manny Pacquiao owns the 100th Phoenix station in General Santos.

In 2012, Phoenix is the seventh top importer in the country having remitted  in import taxes to the government. Phoenix reportedly ended the first quarter of 2013 with 325 retail stations. The revenue of Phoenix in the first quarter of 2013 increased from  last year to  this year

On February 1, 2013, Phoenix Petroleum signed a marketing partnership with the National Basketball Association (NBA) as the Official Petroleum Partner of the NBA in the Philippines. Phoenix Petroleum will be integrated into NBA media and events in the country, including NBA.com/Philippines and the Jr. NBA presented by Alaska, the league's youth basketball development program. As part of the partnership, Phoenix Petroleum will also conduct NBA themed promotions in 300 service stations nationwide, giving fans in the provincial areas a chance to win exciting prizes and unique NBA experiences.

It is also involved in the golf, as the Philippine Sports Commission commends Phoenix for having the long-term development program for golf in the country.

In 2016, Phoenix acquired the franchise of Barako Bull Energy in the Philippine Basketball Association (PBA). Prior to this, Phoenix participated in the PBA D-League in 2016 as the Phoenix Petroleum Accelerators. The Phoenix PBA franchise is playing currently as the Phoenix Super LPG Fuel Masters.

In 2017, Phoenix entered the LPG industry after acquiring Petronas Energy Philippines Inc., which became what is now Phoenix LPG Philippines, Inc.

In 2018, Phoenix has completed its acquisition of the Philippine franchise of the convenience store chain FamilyMart, from Ayala Corporation, Rustan's Group and ITOCHU Corporation. This even led to establishing FamilyMart branches at select Phoenix stations.

Products and services 
Terminaling, Hauling and Into-Plane Services

These involve leasing of storage space in its terminal depot, hauling, and into-plane services in the cities of Davao, Cagayan de Oro, Cotabato, Zamboanga, and Ozamis. The Phoenix depots store variety of chemical and petroleum products and are available as bulk storage facilities. The company also operates trucks that deliver products to customers 24/7 through Petrologistix Inc., its subsidiary.

Trading, Supply, and Distribution of Fuels
Phoenix offers range of petroleum products for different needs of motorists. The company also delivers Phoenix fuels to the client's area and for high volume accounts, Phoenix sets up pump stations within the client's area of operation.

Lubricants & Specialties
Gasoline engine oils, diesel engine oils, motorcycle oils, automotive engine oils, transmission oils, automotive greases, industrial lubricants are among the lubricants sold by Phoenix Petroleum Philippines, Inc.

Expansion
Phoenix Petroleum Philippines, Inc. acquired the  Batangas Union Industrial Park in 2007. The park is now known as Phoenix Petroterminals & Industrial Park.

The Board of Investments had also granted tax and fiscal incentives to Phoenix for its petroleum product facility in Zamboanga City, a  project with a 4.9 million-liter storage facility for Phoenix petroleum products. Phoenix has other depots in Davao City, Aklan, Surigao, Zamboanga, Batangas, and Cagayan De Oro. They also plan to build more in Cebu and Bacolod.

Socioeconomic involvement
Through the Phoenix Philippines Foundation, Inc., the company supports and initiates projects in education, health, environment, and outreach. Some of its regular activities include the Adopt-a-School program, book donation, coastal clean-up, blood donation, tree planting, and annual Christmas party to children.

See also
 Phoenix Fuel Masters
 Udenna Corporation
 Dito Telecommunity
 List of gas station chains in the Philippines

References

External links
Phoenix Petroleum Philippines, Inc. Official Website
History of Phoenix Petroleum Philippines, Inc.
Company profile of Phoenix in the Philippine Stock Exchange

Oil and gas companies of the Philippines
Companies based in Davao City
Energy companies established in 2002
Non-renewable resource companies established in 2002
Companies listed on the Philippine Stock Exchange
Udenna Corporation
Gas stations in the Philippines